Aaly Karashev (Kyrgyz: Аалы Азимович Карашев)(born 30 October 1968) is a Kyrgyz politician who served as acting Prime Minister from 1 September to 5 September 2012.

References

1968 births
Living people
Prime Ministers of Kyrgyzstan